Round Table Advertising (Round Table) is a privately held full-service advertising agency located in Toronto, Ontario. The company was founded as Round Table Advertising Inc. in 2000 by former co-workers Sallah Cayer, Fiona Gallagher, and Brent Peterson.

The company asserts it is "a senior hands on, caring and committed group that offers experience, discipline and leadership with a working style that is collaborative, efficient and effective".

Clients
Round Table's past and present clients include:

Alliance Atlantis - Showcase Television
Burnbrae Farms
Concerned Children's Advertisers
COTA Health
Fairmont Hotels and Resorts
First Base
Toronto.com
Janes Family Foods
Park'N Fly
Providence Healthcare
Ronald McDonald House Charities
Scottish & Newcastle - Strongbow Cider
Shell Oil Company - Automotive Accessories
Toronto Parking Authority
Weston Bakeries Ltd.
Workopolis

Notable campaigns

Round Table has produced numerous campaigns for various Weston Bakeries Ltd. brands including Wonder Bread. Leading up to the 2010 Winter Games, the company produced several Olympic-themed advertisements for the brand. A 30-second television commercial shown during the games which featured children singing the Canadian anthem received national media attention.

In 2010, in an ongoing effort to promote the nutritional credentials of the Wonder bread brand, the company produced a 30-second television commercial referencing the brand's history and the changes in its product lineup.

In 2008 Weston Bakeries Ltd. introduced Canada's first sliced bread with Omega 3 DHA. As part of a multimillion-dollar Canada-wide campaign, Round Table developed television commercials as well as print ads aimed at consumers, dietitians, doctors, and pediatricians.

In the summer of 2007, Scottish & Newcastle ran its first advertising campaign in Canada for the popular British beverage, Strongbow Cider. The campaign included various non-traditional executions of outdoor advertising.

Awards
Round Table Advertising has been recognized on numerous occasions for outstanding work in several categories:
The CASSIES Awards
2007 Bronze - Packaged Goods - Food - Wonder Plus
2007 Bronze - Best Launch - Wonder Plus
2006 Silver - Off To A Good Start - Wonder Plus
2003 Certificate of Excellence - Quebec & Regional English - Toronto.com
2002 Certificate of Excellence - Off To A Good Start  - Toronto.com
Promax Awards
2007 North America PROMAX Silver - Branding/Image Campaign Using One or More Media
2007 North America BDA Bronze - Total Package Design: Image All Inclusive Combination
Media Innovation Awards
2008 Certificate - Television - Wonder
2007 Bronze - Radio - Workopolis
2003 Silver - Television - Wonder

References

External links
Official Web Site

Advertising agencies of Canada
Marketing companies established in 2000
Companies based in Toronto